Anett Mészáros (born 14 July 1987 in Budapest) is a judoka from Hungary.

Mészáros claimed gold at the European Judo Championships in Vienna in August 2010.

References

External links
 

Hungarian female judoka
Living people
1987 births
Martial artists from Budapest
Judoka at the 2008 Summer Olympics
Judoka at the 2012 Summer Olympics
Olympic judoka of Hungary
21st-century Hungarian women